The 1989 Sunkist Fiesta Bowl, played on Monday, January 2, was the 18th edition of the Fiesta Bowl. It featured the top-ranked Notre Dame Fighting Irish and the third-ranked West Virginia Mountaineers.  With both teams undefeated, the Fiesta Bowl was the stage for the "national championship" for the second time in three years. As in 1987, the Fiesta Bowl featured two independents squaring off for the national title.

Also, as in 1987, the game was played on January 2, but this was because New Year's Day fell on a Sunday in 1989 and, per protocols, all of the bowls that would normally take place that day were played on January 2.

Game summary
After West Virginia quarterback and Heisman candidate Major Harris separated his shoulder on the third play of the game, Notre Dame took control to claim their record eleventh national championship. Though Harris would return to the game he was severely hampered by  Coach Nehlen later admitting that WVU had to abandon a large portion of its gameplan due to the injury of Harris. WVU also suffered the loss of three other starters during the 1st half which did not help matters. They were NG Jim Gray, OG John Stroia, and productive reserve running back Undra Johnson also left the game early with a knee injury on his first carry. Johnson had rushed for over 700yds and 11 TDs during the 1988 season. WVU had already went into the game without its starting FS Darrell Whitmore who was injured in the final game of the season.

Billy Hackett started the scoring with a 45-yard field goal to give Notre Dame an early 3–0 lead.  Running back Anthony Johnson then scored on a 1-yard touchdown run, but the ensuing extra point missed, and the score remained   Early in the second quarter, Rodney Culver added a 5-yard touchdown run to increase Notre Dame's lead  Charlie Baumann of West Virginia scored on a 29-yard field goal to cut the lead 

Later in the second quarter, Tony Rice threw a 29-yard touchdown pass to Raghib Ismail, to extend the lead to 23–3.  Mountaineer Charlie Baumann added a 31-yard field goal before halftime to make 

Early in the third quarter, Reggie Ho added a 32-yard field goal to increase the Irish lead to 26–6. WVU quarterback Harris hit Grantis Bell for a 17-yard touchdown pass, cutting the lead to 26–13.  He later left the game with an injury.  Rice threw a 3-yard touchdown pass to Frank Jacobs.  Rice later took it in himself for the 2-point conversion, giving Notre Dame a 34–13 lead.  WVU scored with a 3-yard touchdown run by Reggie Rembert, who also converted the 2-point conversion, making the score 34–21.  Notre Dame sealed the win by intercepting a pass in the end zone.

Notre Dame retained its top ranking in the final AP poll and West Virginia fell   this remains the most recent national championship for the Irish.

Scoring summary

Statistics
{| class=wikitable style="text-align:center"
! Statistics !! WestVirginia !! NotreDame
|-
|align=left|First Downs || 19 || 19
|-
|align=left|Rushes–yards|| 37–108|| 59–242
|-
|align=left|Passing yards || 174 || 213
|-
|align=left|Passes || 14–30–1 || 7–11–1
|-
|align=left|Total yards || 282 || 455
|-
|align=left|Punts–average ||7–45|| 4–37
|-
|align=left|Fumbles–lost ||0–0|| 2–0
|-
|align=left|Turnovers by||1||1
|-
|align=left|Penalties-yards ||3–38|| 11–102
|-
|align=left|Time of possession ||23:17||36:43
|}

References

Fiesta Bowl
Fiesta Bowl
Notre Dame Fighting Irish football bowl games
West Virginia Mountaineers football bowl games
Fiesta Bowl
January 1989 sports events in the United States